= Clemmy Hadebe =

South African trans woman

- Cause of death: Multiple gunshots
- Occupations: Sex worker; LGBTQ activist

Clemmy Hadebe (aged 29), was a South African trans woman from Madadeni in Newcastle, in KwaZulu-Natal province, and an LGBTQ rights activist. She was murdered on 16 August 2024 through multiple gun shots in Johannesburg and her case remains unsolved.
